Odina is a genus of skipper butterflies in the family Hesperiidae first described by Paul Mabille in 1891. The species in this genus are found in the Indomalayan realm.

Species
Odina decoratus (Hewitson, 1867)
Odina hieroglyphica (Butler, 1870)
Odina chrysomelaena (Mabille, 1891)

References

Tagiadini
Hesperiidae genera
Taxa named by Paul Mabille